The 2017 Australian Open wildcard playoffs and entries are a group of events and internal selections to choose the eight men and eight women singles wildcard entries for the 2017 Australian Open, as well as seven male and seven female doubles teams plus eight mixed-doubles teams.

Wildcard entries

Men's singles

Women's singles

Men's doubles

Women's doubles

Mixed doubles

US Wildcard Challenge
The US awarded a wildcard to the man and woman that earned the most ranking points across a group of three Challenger/ITF hardcourt events in the United States in October and November 2016. For the men, it was the Charlottesville, Knoxville and Champaign Challengers and for the women, it was Macon, Scottsdale and Waco. Only the best two results from the three challengers were taken into account with the winners being teenagers Michael Mmoh and Kayla Day. These players were announced on 18 November 2016.

Men's standings

Women's standings

Asia-Pacific Wildcard Playoff
The Asia-Pacific Australian Open Wildcard Play-off featured 16-players in the men's and women's singles draws and took place from 28 November to 4 December 2016 at Hengqin International Tennis Centre in Zhuhai, China.

Men's singles

Seeds

  Denis Istomin (winner)
  Lee Duck-hee (final)
  Wu Di (semifinals)
  Li Zhe (first round)

  Prajnesh Gunneswaran (semifinals)
  Kwon Soon-woo (first round)
  Gao Xin (first round)
  Vijay Sundar Prashanth (quarterfinals)

Draw

Women's singles

Seeds

  Hsieh Su-wei (quarterfinals, withdrew)
  Chang Kai-chen (final)
  Luksika Kumkhum (winner)
  Sabina Sharipova (first round)

  Junri Namigata (semifinals)
  Lu Jingjing (quarterfinals)
  Kyōka Okamura (first round)
  Ankita Raina (quarterfinals)

Draw

Men's doubles

Seeds

  Zhe Li /  Yi Chu-huan (semifinals)
  Peng Hsien-yin /  Di Wu (quarterfinals)

  Hsieh Cheng-peng /  Yang Tsung-hua (winners)
  Jeevan Nedunchezhiyan /  Vijay Sundar Prashanth (final)

Draw

Women's doubles

Seeds

  Peangtarn Plipuech /  Varatchaya Wongteanchai (semifinals)
  Lu Jingjing /  You Xiaodi (semifinals)

  Chang Kai-chen /  Hsu Ching-wen (final)
  Ankita Raina /  Sabina Sharipova (quarterfinals)

Draw

Australian Wildcard Playoff
The December Showdown is held annually for two weeks in December. The Showdown includes age championships for 12/u, 14/u, 16/u and 18/u age categories. It also hosts the 2017 Australian Wildcard Playoff which will be held from 12–18 December 2016 at Melbourne Park. For the first time, a women's doubles playoff will be contested, with the winner receiving a main draw wildcard into the 2017 Australian Open women's doubles. For the second time in a row, the winner of the girls' 18/u championship will be given a main draw wildcard into the 2017 Australian Open.

Men's singles

Seeds

Draw

Women's singles

Seeds

Draw

Women's doubles

Seeds

Draw

Boys' singles

Seeds

Draw

Girls' singles

Seeds

Draw

References

External links
 American Wildcard Challenge standings
 December Showdown website
 Australian Wildcard Playoff website
 Australian Wildcard Playoff draws
 18/u Australian Championships draws
 Asian Wildcard Playoff website
 Asian Wildcard Playoff Men's singles draw
 Asian Wildcard Playoff Women's singles draw
 Asian Wildcard Playoff Men's doubles draw
 Asian Wildcard Playoff Women's doubles draw
 Asian Wildcard Playoff Men's qualifying draw
 Asian Wildcard Playoff Women's qualifying draw